Revelo is an unincorporated community within McCreary County, Kentucky, United States.

Originally a railroad siding for Southern Railway (US), the community was named for James Henry Oliver, an executive Vice President of Southern's Kentucky Division. Oliver was killed in a passenger train collision in 1918 in Danville, Virginia.

"Revilo" is "Oliver" spelled backwards. The United States Postal Service changed it to the modern spelling in 1943.

References

Unincorporated communities in McCreary County, Kentucky
Unincorporated communities in Kentucky